Milena Toscano  Gonçalves (born January 11, 1984), is a Brazilian actress.

Career 
Born in Santo André, São Paulo, Milena Toscano started her career as a model when she was ten years-old, after she was hired by the Ford Models Agency. She performed in her first TV commercial when she was 13 years old. After attending many performing arts schools such as Studio Fátima Toledo, Casa de Artes de Laranjeiras and Escola Livre de Teatro, she was signed by Rede Globo. She debuted in the 2004 telenovela Começar de Novo, playing the character Sofia. Milena Toscano played Martina in SBT's remake of the Mexican telenovela Los Ricos También Lloran, named Los Ricos também Choram, which aired from 2005 to 2006. She also played a lead role in 2010, in the Rede Globo telenovela Araguaia, playing Manuela Martinez. She played the character Vanessa in the 2011 telenovela Fina Estampa. Milena Toscano played an abolitionist and feminist named Filipa do Amaral in the 2016 Escrava Mãe.

Filmography

Telenovelas

Cinema 
Feature-length films

Theater

Awards

References

External links
 

1984 births
Living people
People from Santo André, São Paulo
Brazilian film actresses
Brazilian telenovela actresses
Brazilian stage actresses
Brazilian female models